The Sumatran lar gibbon (Hylobates lar vestitus), also known as the Sumatran white-handed gibbon, is a subspecies of the lar gibbon, a primate in the gibbon family Hylobatidae. It is native to the island of Sumatra, Indonesia. It shares the tree tops with orangutans, which, like the gibbon, rarely come out of the trees due to predators, such as tigers and possibly sun bears.

References

External links
ARKive - images and movies of the white-handed gibbon (Hylobates lar)
Gibbon Conservation Center
Thomas Geissmann's Gibbon Research Lab and Gibbon Network

Sumatran lar gibbon
Endemic fauna of Indonesia
Endemic fauna of Sumatra
Fauna of Sumatra
Primates of Indonesia
Endangered fauna of Asia
Sumatran lar gibbon
Taxa named by Gerrit Smith Miller Jr.